Lars-Göran Lönnermark, born 26 August 1939, is a Swedish bishop emeritus.

Lönnermark studied at Michigan State University in 1958–1959 through the international exchange program, where he became a member of Delta Upsilon fraternity. After returning to Sweden, he studied theology and was ordained as a pastor in the Evangelical Lutheran Church (Church of Sweden) in 1964.

He was bishop of Skara between 1989 and 2004. In 1988, he was named as high predicate of the congregation in Stockholm, and on 1 April 2007 as head predicate. Lars-Göran Lönnermark took over from head predicate Henrik Svenungsson, bishop emeritus of Stockholm.

Lönnermark took part in the wedding of Victoria, Crown Princess of Sweden, and Daniel Westling on 19 June 2010.

References

Bishops of Skara
1939 births
Living people
Michigan State University alumni